The Scourge of the Light is the ninth studio album by American power metal band Jag Panzer. It was released on February 28, 2011 through Steamhammer Records. Two weeks after its release, The Scourge of the Light placed at No. 117 on the Billboard New Artist chart, making the album Jag Panzer's most successful to date.

Track listing

Personnel
Harry Conklin – vocals
Mark Briody – guitar, keyboards
Christian Lasegue – guitar
John Tetley – bass guitar
Rikard Stjernquist – drums

References

Jag Panzer albums
2011 albums
Steamhammer Records albums